Sunrise Lake is a census-designated place and private lake community located in Dingman Township, Pike County in the state of Pennsylvania. The community is located along Pennsylvania Route 739 in eastern Pike County, about eight miles west of the New Jersey state line at the Delaware River. Sunrise Lake is between, and shares borders with, the CDP communities of Conashaugh Lakes and Gold Key Lake.  Sunrise Lake shares its name with the lake of the same name that the community surrounds.  As of the 2010 census the population was 1,387 residents.

History of the area
Before humans, the land was under thousands of feet of ice during the Wisconsin Glaciation. After melting glaciers left kettle lakes such as nearby Gold Key Lake, the land was left rock-strewn and rough. Considered a part of the Glaciated Low Plateau section of Pennsylvania, the land is slightly varied in elevation with the Sunrise Lake's main dam measured at 1309.8 feet above sea level

Before the arrival of European settlers, the land now encompassing most of Pike County was the domain of the Lenape people. The Lenape were expelled from the area after the Walking Purchase of 1737, which placed a large amount of new territory under the control of the Province of Pennsylvania. The land was next under conflict because it was claimed by settlers from Connecticut, eventually fueling the Pennamite–Yankee Wars between 1769 and 1784. After the Revolutionary War, the former colony became today's Commonwealth of Pennsylvania and land began to be settled.

Like many of the private lake communities in the area such as Gold Key and Woodlands, the land which is now Sunrise Lake was originally purchased by a private developer and subdivided into residential housing. A property owners' association was organized in 2009, following resident disapproval of the management of the community.

Schooling
The community is served by the Delaware Valley School District, with local schooling from Kindergarten through eighth grade. Delaware Valley High School in Westfall provides ninth through twelfth grade education.

Transportation
The community's main roads lead to Route 739. 739 leads to Route 6 and Interstate 84, the closest major highway. A close minor road is Log Tavern Road, which is a route to Milford from just outside the community's main entrance.

References

Census-designated places in Pike County, Pennsylvania
Census-designated places in Pennsylvania